R500 road may refer to:
 R500 road (Ireland)
 R500 road (South Africa)